André Ruffet (10 September 1929 – 15 August 2011) was a French racing cyclist. He rode in the 1951 Tour de France.

References

1929 births
2011 deaths
French male cyclists
Place of birth missing